Dän Swänska Theatren ('The Swedish Theatre') was an all-male Swedish Theatre Comedy troupe, active between 1682 and 1691: from 1686 in Stockholm. The company performed in Lejonkulan in 1686-89 and in Bollhuset in 1689–91. They were the first theater company in Sweden composed of Swedish actors and formed the first Swedish language theater in Sweden.  However, they were a company formed of student actors from Uppsala University, who did not regard themselves as professional actors and who referred to their activity as temporary, which it also was.    Nevertheless, they were pioneers in the history of the Swedish theater.

Members
 Olaus Rudbeck
 Johan Celsius
 Isaak Börk, the director of the company
 Carl Johan Ollieqvisth
 Andreas Strömbergh
 Georg Törnqvist-Adlercreutz, actor, writer and translator
 Johan Widman

References

 Dahlberg, Gunilla (1992). Komediantteatern i 1600-talets Stockholm. Stockholm: Komm. för Stockholmsforskning. 

17th century in Sweden
Swedish comedy troupes
Former theatres in Stockholm
1682 establishments in Sweden
Theatre companies in Sweden
17th century in Stockholm
Swedish Empire